Vincent Herbert (born January 27, 1972) is an American songwriter, record producer, record executive, and founder of Streamline Records, an imprint of Interscope Records.

Work
He has worked with artists such as Aaliyah, Tatyana Ali, Toni Braxton, Destinee & Paris, Destiny's Child, Dream, Hi-Five, JoJo, Mindless Behavior, OMG Girlz, Mishon Ratliff as well as Lady Gaga and his ex-wife, Tamar Braxton.

Among other work, Herbert co-starred with his ex-wife in their WE tv reality series Tamar & Vince , a spinoff of her family's reality show Braxton Family Values, which premiered on the network on September 20, 2012. Herbert also managed his ex-wife, Tamar Braxton's career, and served as an executive producer on her second studio album Love and War which was released on his record label Streamline Records coincide with its parent label Interscope Records and Epic Records (all jointly signed Tamar as an artist to each label).

Personal life
Herbert married singer Tamar Braxton, in 2008. The couple's son Logan Vincent Herbert was born in 2013. In October 2017, Braxton filed for divorce from Herbert, citing "irreconcilable differences" and is seeking joint custody of their son. Their divorce was finalized on July 16, 2019.

Herbert and Braxton starred in the reality TV show Tamar & Vince.

Credit

References

External links
"Who Is Tamar Braxton's Husband"
"Happy Father's Day to the love of my life, my best friend, my husband Vincent Herbert! Our son Logan..."

1973 births
Living people
Writers from Newark, New Jersey
American male songwriters
Record producers from New Jersey
Place of birth missing (living people)
Songwriters from New Jersey
Musicians from Newark, New Jersey
Businesspeople from Newark, New Jersey